Vijayender Pal Singh Badnore (born 12 May 1948) is an Indian politician who was the 28th Governor of Punjab. He was a member of Rajya Sabha, elected on 17 June 2010. He was earlier a member of the 14th Lok Sabha and 13th Lok Sabha of the Indian Parliament. He represented the Bhilwara constituency of Rajasthan and is a member of the Bharatiya Janata Party (BJP) political party from 1999 to 2009 and also 4 time Member of Rajasthan Legislative Assembly (1977–80, 1985–90, 1993–98, 1998–99).

Personal life 
Singh was born in Badnor, Rajasthan to Gopal Singh and Raj Kanwar Nathawad. He completed his Bachelor of Arts (Honours) in English and Business Management from Mayo College in Ajmer. Singh married Alka Singh on 25 November 1978. They have a son named Avijit and a daughter Divija.

Career
Badnore was a member of Rajasthan Legislative Assembly from 1977 to 1980, 1985–90, 1993–98 and 1998–99. He was the Cabinet Minister for Irrigation in the Government of Rajasthan from 1988 to 1999. He was the vice president in BJP Sangathan Rajasthan for over 15 years.

He was also a member of 13th (1999-2004) and 14th Lok Sabha (2004-2009), where he was a member of standing committee of Parliament for last 14 years and a convener of the Drafting committee of the Electricity Act 2003. Badnore was a member  of the Rajya Sabha from 2010 to 2016, being nominated to the Panel of Vice Chairman, Rajya Sabha in August 2014.

He was the Chairman Special Task Force to rehabilitate tigers in Sariska (Rajasthan), Government of Rajasthan 2005 to 2009, after the Sariska debacle – when all tigers were poached in Sariska in 2003–2004. Rehabilitation of tigers was done by translocation of tigers from Ranthambore Tiger Reserve.

He was appointed the Governor of Punjab on 17 August 2016. He relinquished office on 30 August 2021.

References

External links
 Official biographical sketch in Parliament of India website
 ess, BJP share honours in RS polls

|-

1948 births
Living people
Bharatiya Janata Party politicians from Rajasthan
Mayo College alumni
India MPs 1999–2004
India MPs 2004–2009
People from Bhilwara district
Rajya Sabha members from Rajasthan
Lok Sabha members from Rajasthan
Rajasthan MLAs 1977–1980